Nabaghanapur is a census town in the Faridpur Durgapur CD block in the Durgapur subdivision of the Paschim Bardhaman district in the Indian state of West Bengal.

Geography

Location

Banagram, Mandarbani, Sirsha, Nabaghanapur, Sarpi and Ichhapur form a  series of census towns along the western border of Faridpur-Durgapur CD block.

Urbanisation
According to the 2011 census, 79.22% of the population of the Durgapur subdivision was urban and 20.78% was rural. Durgapur subdivision has 1 municipal corporation at Durgapur and 38 (+1 partly) census towns  (partly presented in the map alongside; all places marked on the map are linked in the full-screen map).

Demographics
According to the 2011 Census of India, Nabaghanapur had a total population of 5,383 of which 2,931 (54%) were males and 2,452 (46%) were females. Population in the age range 0-6 years was 408. The total number of 1literate persons in Nabaghanapur was 4,175 (83.92% of the population over 6 years).

*For language details see Faridpur Durgapur#Language and religion

Infrastructure

According to the District Census Handbook 2011, Bardhaman, Nabaghanapur covered an area of 3.1086 km2. Among the civic amenities, the protected water-supply involved overhead tank, tap water from treated sources, uncovered well. It had 482 domestic electric connections. Among the medical facilities it had 1 maternity and child welfare centre, 2 medicine shops. Among the educational facilities it had were 2 primary schools, other school facilities at Kalipur 4.5 km away or Laudoha 2 km away. Among the important commodities it produced were paddy, wheat and mustard.

Economy
As per the ECL website telephone numbers, operational collieries in the Bankola Area of Eastern Coalfields in 2018 are: Bankola Colliery, Khandra Colliery, Kumardih A Colliery, Kumardih B Colliery, Moira Colliery, Nakrakonda Colliery, Shankarpur Colliery, Shyamsundarpur Colliery and Tilaboni Colliery.

References

Cities and towns in Paschim Bardhaman district